Shanejan (also Romanized as Shānejān and Shānjān; also known as Chakawān, Chana‘vān, and Keyvān) is a village in Guney-ye Sharqi Rural District, in the Central District of Shabestar County, East Azerbaijan Province, Iran. At the 2011 census, its population was 356, in 102 families.

References 

Populated places in Shabestar County